Your Valet is a 1922 German silent film directed by Willy Achsel and starring Erika Glässner, Gerhard Ritterband, and Karl Günther.

The film's sets were designed by the art director Carl Ludwig Kirmse.

Cast

References

External links

1922 films
Films of the Weimar Republic
German silent feature films
Films directed by Willy Achsel
German black-and-white films
Terra Film films
1920s German films